Ruslan Dzhumbayevich Sydykov (Russian Руслан Джумбаевич Сыдыков), born in a Tatar family on 4 January 1975, is a former Kyrgyzstani footballer who played as a defender for Dordoi Bishkek. He was a member of the Kyrgyzstan national football team. Sydykov won the Kyrgyzstan footballer of the year in 2005 and 2006 .

Career

Club
Sydykov retired from football at the end of the 2014 season.

Managerial
In November 2015, Sydykov was appointed as manager of Ala-Too Naryn.

On 6 June 2016, Sydykov replaced Anarbek Ormombekov as manager of Dordoi Bishkek, having previously been his assistant, until the end of the season.

Career statistics

International

Statistics accurate as of match played 14 June 2013

Goals for Senior National Team

References

External links
 
 Player profile – doha-2006.com

1975 births
Living people
Kyrgyzstani footballers
Kyrgyzstan international footballers
Kyrgyzstani expatriate footballers
Kyrgyzstani expatriate sportspeople in India
Expatriate footballers in India
FC Dinamo Bishkek players
FC Dordoi Bishkek players
Tatar sportspeople
Kyrgyzstani people of Tatar descent
Footballers at the 2006 Asian Games
Association football defenders
Asian Games competitors for Kyrgyzstan